Manon des Sources (meaning Manon of the Springs) is a 1986 French language period film. Directed by Claude Berri, it is the second of two films adapted from the 1966 two-volume novel by Marcel Pagnol, who wrote it based on his own earlier film of the same title. It is the sequel to Jean de Florette.

Jean de Florette and Manon des Sources are ranked No. 60 in Empire magazine's "The 100 Best Films of World Cinema" in 2010.

Plot
Following the events of Jean de Florette, Manon, the daughter of Jean, is living in the countryside of Provence near Les Romarins, the farm that her father once owned.  She has taken up residence with an elderly Piedmontese squatter couple who teach her to live off the land, tending to a herd of goats and hunting for birds and rabbits.  Ugolin Soubeyran, also called Galinette (only by his uncle César), has begun a successful business growing carnations at Les Romarins with his uncle, César Soubeyran—also known as Papet—thanks to the water provided by the spring there.

After seeing her bathe nude in the mountains, Ugolin develops an interest in Manon. When he approaches her, she seems disgusted by his vileness and almost certainly by the memory of his involvement in her father's downfall. But Ugolin's interest in Manon becomes obsessive, culminating in sewing a ribbon from her hair onto his chest. At the same time, Manon becomes interested in Bernard, a handsome and educated schoolteacher recently arrived in the village. As a small child, Manon had suffered the loss of her father, who died from a blow to the head while using explosives in an attempt to find a water source. César and Ugolin then bought the farm cheaply from his widow—Manon's mother—and unblocked the spring. Manon witnessed this as a child. The two men profited directly from his death.

When she overhears two villagers talking about it, Manon realises that many in the village knew of the crime but had remained silent, for the Soubeyran family was locally important. While searching for a goat that fell into a crevice above the village, Manon finds the underground source of the spring that supplies water to the local farms and village. To take her revenge on both the Soubeyrans and the villagers, who knew but did nothing, she stops the flow of water using the iron-oxide clay and rocks found nearby.

The villagers quickly become desperate for water to feed their crops and run their businesses. They come to believe that the water flow had been stopped by some Providence to punish the injustice committed against Jean. Manon publicly accuses César and Ugolin, and the villagers  admit their own complicity in the persecution of Jean. They had never accepted him, as he was an outsider and was physically deformed. César tries to evade the accusations, but an eyewitness, a poacher who was trespassing on the vacant property at the time, steps forward to confirm the crime, shaming both César and Ugolin. Ugolin makes a desperate attempt to ask Manon for her hand in marriage, but she rejects him. The Soubeyrans flee in disgrace. Rejected by Manon, Ugolin commits suicide by hanging himself from a tree, apparently ending the Soubeyran line.

The villagers appeal to Manon to take part in a religious procession to the village's fountain because she is orphaned, hoping that acknowledging the injustice will restore the flow of water to the village. With the assistance of Bernard, Manon unblocks the spring in advance, and the water arrives at the village at the moment that the procession reaches the fountain. Manon marries Bernard.

Meanwhile, César has been broken by his nephew's suicide. Delphine, an old acquaintance of his, returns to the village and tells him that Florette, his sweetheart from that period, had written to him to tell him she was carrying their child. Receiving no reply from him, she had tried to abort it. Florette left the village, married a blacksmith from nearby Créspin, and the child was born alive but a hunchback.

César, away on military service in Africa, never received her letter and did not know that she had given birth to his child.  In a cruel twist of fate, Jean, the man he drove to desperation and death without having met him, was the son he had always wanted. Realizing now she is related to him, César sadly watches a pregnant Manon hurry home at night, wishing to reconcile with his only grandchild, but knowing it will never happen.

Devastated, and lacking the will to live any longer, César dies quietly in his sleep. In a letter he leaves his property to Manon, whom he recognises as his natural granddaughter and the last of the Soubeyrans.

Cast
 Emmanuelle Béart as Manon
 Yves Montand as César Soubeyran/'Le Papet'
 Daniel Auteuil as Ugolin
 Hippolyte Girardot as Bernard Olivier
 Margarita Lozano as Baptistine
 Yvonne Gamy as Delphine
 Gabriel Bacquier and Ève Brenner as singers at the wedding

Production
The sequence in which Manon bathes naked posed some difficulties. Being modest, Emmanuelle Béart was reluctant to undress in front of the crew. In an effort to resolve the situation, Claude Berri undressed and dived naked into the water to break the ice. As a result, Béart followed suit.

Box office 

The film was a domestic and international success, grossing nearly $4 million in US sales.

Awards
 César Award for Best Actor - Daniel Auteuil, 1987
 César Award for Best Actress in a Supporting Role – Emmanuelle Béart, 1987
 Best Foreign Language Film, National Board of Review, 1987

References

External links 
 
 
 
 
 Trailer (1986)
 New York Times review

1986 films
1986 drama films
French drama films
Swiss drama films
1980s French-language films
French films about revenge
Italian films about revenge
Films based on French novels
Films based on works by Marcel Pagnol
Films directed by Claude Berri
Films set in France
Films with screenplays by Claude Berri
Films with screenplays by Gérard Brach
Squatting in film
French-language Swiss films
1980s Italian films
1980s French films